JCAP may refer to:

 Joint Center for Artificial Photosynthesis, a DOE Energy Innovation Hub
 Journal of Cosmology and Astroparticle Physics, a peer reviewed scientific journal